The Hamilton Mill Village Historic District  is a historic district encompassing a small mill village in  North Kingstown, Rhode Island.  It is located on the south side of the Annaquatucket River, near its mouth at Bissell Cove.  The village includes two wood-frame mill buildings and a collection of mill worker housing units, which line a short section of Boston Neck Road as well as Salisbury Avenue, Web Avenue, and Martha Road.  The most impressive mill building is the main mill, built in 1853 and enlarged in 1866 with a double clerestory roof, something not found in other surviving mills in the state.

The district was added to the National Register of Historic Places in 1983.

See also
National Register of Historic Places listings in Washington County, Rhode Island

References

North Kingstown, Rhode Island
Historic districts in Washington County, Rhode Island
Industrial buildings and structures on the National Register of Historic Places in Rhode Island
Historic districts on the National Register of Historic Places in Rhode Island
National Register of Historic Places in Washington County, Rhode Island